Manuela Aigner (born 26 March 1973) is a retired German high jumper.

She won the 1991 European Junior Championships and the 1992 World Junior Championships, the latter in a career best jump of 1.93 metres. She represented the sports club BSV AOK Leipzig, and won the bronze medal at the German championships in 1994.

References
 

1973 births
Living people
German female high jumpers